Mark Herzlich Jr. (born September 1, 1987) is a former American football linebacker and current sports commentator. He was signed by the New York Giants as an undrafted free agent in 2011 and played all seven seasons of his professional career with the Giants. He played college football at Boston College.

Early life
Herzlich was born in Kirkwood, Missouri, the son of Barbara Read (born Martin), a former tennis player, and Sandon Mark Herzlich. His paternal grandfather's Ashkenazi Jewish family left Austria after the German annexation. His father was raised Jewish and converted to Protestantism when Herzlich was born.  He has one sibling, younger brother Bradley Martin, who was a member of the football team at Brown University.

High school career
Herzlich attended Conestoga High School in Tredyffrin Township, Pennsylvania, where he earned Associated Press Class First-team AAAA All-State honors as senior linebacker. Considered a three-star prospect by Rivals.com, Herzlich was recruited by Boston College, Duke, North Carolina, Vanderbilt and Virginia. He was committed to Virginia some time before he chose to play for Boston College.  He recorded 142 tackles and made four interceptions as a junior and also lined up at fullback in 2003 and 2004, scoring three offensive touchdowns.  As a senior, he registered a team-high 153 tackles, including 48 solo stops, in 2005, and totaled eight tackles for loss, including four sacks; he also returned a blocked field goal 86 yards for a touchdown.  He led the Pioneers to back-to-back Central League titles (2004 and 2005) and became the first player in school history to win the team MVP award three times. Herzlich was also a lacrosse star at Conestoga, and received a scholarship offer from Johns Hopkins University to play lacrosse.

College career
Herzlich went on to attend Boston College and played in all 13 games as a true freshman.  He earned College Football News Freshman All-American honors with a total of 42 tackles (32 solo), including 5.0 tackles for a loss and 1.0 sack, one interception and forced two fumbles. As a sophomore, he started all 14 games for the Eagles and finished the season second in total tackles with 97 (55 solos, 42 assists). He also led the team with 12 tackles-for-loss to go with 1.5 quarterback sacks and 4 pass breakups, 2 forced fumbles, 2 fumble recoveries. Herzlich entered his junior season (2008) as a preseason all-star candidate. He was named to the Lott Trophy and Butkus Award watchlists prior to the season. In 2008 Herzlich was a First-team All-American and the ACC Defensive Player of the Year. He was also a finalist for the Butkus Award, and a quarterfinalist for the Lott Trophy. He led the team with 110 tackles and 81 stops, six interceptions, eight pass break-ups, two forced fumbles, two fumble recoveries, and 13 tackles for a loss. In November 2008, Herzlich was a projected top-15 pick by many scouts for the 2009 NFL Draft but announced his return to Boston College for the 2009 season.

Herzlich missed the entire 2009 season due to Ewing's sarcoma, a rare form of bone cancer, which he overcame and earned numerous honors for his courage and outreach, including the Disney Spirit Award, Nils V. "Swede" Nelson Award, an honorary Lott Trophy, and the ACC Commissioner’s Cup.

In 2010, Herzlich returned to the football field and won the Rudy Award and the ACC's Brian Piccolo Award after starting all 13 games and finishing third on the team with 65 tackles and 50 solo stops. He tied for first on the team with two forced fumbles, second on the team with four interceptions and four pass break ups and also had 3.5 tackles for a loss.

Cancer diagnosis
On May 14, 2009, Herzlich announced that he had been diagnosed with Ewing's sarcoma, a rare form of bone cancer, stating in a press release:

On September 29, 2009, Mark Herzlich announced that he was cancer free. This was confirmed by the team doctors. He publicly announced this during the ESPN and Home Depot College Gameday Special at Boston College on October 3, 2009. He sat out the remainder of the 2009 season and returned in 2010, registering five tackles (three solo) in the season-opening 38-20 win against FCS school Weber State.

Despite not playing college football in 2009, he received the Disney's Wide World of Sports Spirit Award for overcoming cancer, as well as the Nils V. "Swede" Nelson Award for sportsmanship. In January 2011, he received the "Most Courageous Athlete" award from the Philadelphia Sports Writers Association.

Professional career

Herzlich was not selected in the 2011 NFL Draft even though he was invited to attend the event. After going undrafted, Herzlich was selected with the 51st pick of the 10th round by the Omaha Nighthawks of the UFL. Despite this, Herzlich stated that he would wait for an NFL contract rather than join the UFL.

On July 26, 2011, the New York Giants signed Herzlich to a three-year, $1.41 million contract as an undrafted free agent at the recommendation of owner John Mara. Herzlich made the New York Giants final 53 man roster. On November 20, 2011, Herzlich made his first NFL start against the Philadelphia Eagles. Set to become a free agent in 2014, he re-signed with the Giants on March 7, 2014.

On March 20, 2017, Herzlich re-signed with the Giants. On September 2, 2017, he was placed on injured reserve after suffering a stinger in training camp.

On March 12, 2018, Herzlich re-signed with the Giants.

On September 1, 2018, Herzlich was released by the Giants.

Post-playing career 
Herzlich joined ACC Network following the end of his playing career, where he serves as a color commentator.

Personal life
Herzlich is a Christian. He is married to Danielle Herzlich. They have three children.

References

External links

Profile at BCEagles.com

1987 births
American football linebackers
American people of Austrian-Jewish descent
Boston College Eagles football players
College football announcers
Living people
New York Giants players
People from Kirkwood, Missouri
Players of American football from Pennsylvania
Sportspeople from Chester County, Pennsylvania
Sportspeople from St. Louis County, Missouri
Ed Block Courage Award recipients